Voytek is a surname. Notable people with the name include:

Ed Voytek (born 1935), American football player
Mary Voytek, American microbiologist
Voytek (designer) (Wojciech Roman Pawel Jerzy Szendzikowski, 1925–2014), Polish stage, television and film designer
Voytek (bear) (1942–1963), Polish Army bear mascot